Clifton Anthony McNeil (born May 25, 1940), aka "The Stick," is a former professional American football player in the National Football League from 1964 through 1973.  He was drafted by the Cleveland Browns in the eleventh round in the 1962 NFL Draft out of Grambling State University.  He played with the Browns for four seasons before being traded to the San Francisco 49ers in 1968 for a draft pick.

With the 49ers in 1968, he led the NFL in receptions with 71, accounting for 994 yards and seven touchdowns and was selected to the Pro Bowl.  After a disappointing 1969 season he went to the New York Giants where he caught 50 passes for 764 yards and four touchdowns before finishing his career with the Washington Redskins and the Houston Oilers.

1940 births
Living people
Sportspeople from Mobile, Alabama
Players of American football from Alabama
American football wide receivers
Cleveland Browns players
San Francisco 49ers players
New York Giants players
Washington Redskins players
Houston Oilers players
Western Conference Pro Bowl players
Grambling State Tigers football players